Bal Chandra Misra (born 17 July 1942) is an Indian politician and former cabinet minister in the Government of Uttar Pradesh.

Life
He was elected four times as MLA from Govind Nagar assembly seat of Kanpur which is the largest assembly seat in Asia as BJP candidate. After 1996 election, CM Kalyan Singh made him minister in his cabinet. He was also minister in Raj Nath Singh cabinet for the department of Food & Civil Supplies and Labour. He was later made regional president of BJP unit Kanpur zone. He is known to take tough decisions with ease and not bowing down to corruption and inappropriate orders from senior leaders. Moreover, many senior leaders consider him as 'Bal Thackeray' of BJP. He is still considered one of the most honest politicians of his time. He actively contributed to rescuing Sikhs, at the risk of his life, during the 1984 Sikh Massacre. He hasn't been properly rewarded for his excellence due to rift between him and senior leaders, (allegedly Murli Manohar Joshi, Member of Parliament from Kanpur seat during 2014–2019) for not accepting their illegitimate demands and has made himself a little apart from politics citing medical reasons but, is still a gem in Indian politics.

References

Bharatiya Janata Party politicians from Uttar Pradesh
Living people
People from Kanpur
State cabinet ministers of Uttar Pradesh
Uttar Pradesh MLAs 1989–1991
Uttar Pradesh MLAs 1991–1993
Uttar Pradesh MLAs 1993–1996
1942 births